Venetian Islands or Venetian Isles can refer to:

The islands in the Venetian Lagoon, including Venice, Italy
Venetian Islands, Florida, USA

See also
Venetian Isles, New Orleans, USA, a neighborhood